Pong Nam Ron is the easternmost district (amphoe) of Chanthaburi province, eastern Thailand.

Geography
Neighboring districts are (from the southwest clockwise) Khlung, Makham, Khao Khitchakut and Soi Dao of Chanthaburi Province. To the east are Battambang and Pailin of Cambodia.

Border Crossings
There are two border crossings into Cambodia in Pong Nam Ron.

One is at Ban Pakkard in Klong Yai tambon. The Cambodian town across the border is Phsar Prum in Sala Krau district in Pailin municipality. The second crossing is at Ban Laem in Thep Nimitr. The Cambodian village across the border is Daun Lem in Kamrieng district, Battambang Province.

History
The minor district (king amphoe) Pong Nam Ron was upgraded to a full district on 25 July 1941.

Administration
The district is divided into five sub-districts (tambons), which are further subdivided into 47 villages (mubans). Pong Nam Ron is a township (thesaban tambon) which covers parts of tambons Pong Nam Ron and Thap Sai. There are a further five tambon administrative organizations (TAO).

Missing numbers are tambon which now form Soi Dao District.

References

External links
amphoe.com

Pong Nam Ron
Cambodia–Thailand border crossings